Daniel James McMahon (born November 1982) is an American multi-instrumentalist, record producer, and audio engineer from Rockford, Illinois, United States. Together with Miles Nielsen, he composed original music for the 2009 documentary film Undefeated, which won the Academy Award for Best Documentary Feature on February 26, 2012. Michael Brook also composed original music for the film.

He has played, toured, and recorded with numerous Midwestern musicians and bands, including Cory Chisel and The Wandering Sons, Miles Nielsen (as part of The Rusted Hearts), and Cameron McGill (as part of What Army), among others. He recorded with all three of these groups, as well as Trapper Schoepp & The Shades, on their respective Daytrotter sessions. His production and accompaniment work with Wisconsin folk-pop duo, Daniel and the Lion, helped the brothers attract the attention of Counting Crows frontman Adam Duritz, who invited the full band to play his Outlaw Roadshow showcase in New York City (as part of the 2013 CMJ Music Marathon festival) and called them, "The best pop band we've ever had at the Roadshow." At the close of day 1 of the Roadshow showcase, McMahon performed onstage with Counting Crows.

In addition to his primary performer role as guitarist and backing vocalist of Miles Nielsen and The Rusted Hearts, he records and plays with Bun E. Carlos (of Cheap Trick) in The Monday Night Band, which performs exclusively on Monday nights.

On April 2, 2012, Rockford, Illinois, Mayor Larry Morrissey declared April 2012 Dan Lindsay, Dan McMahon, and Miles Nielsen month in the City of Rockford for their work on Undefeated. Also in 2012, he received the Outstanding Achievement Award from the Rockford Area Music Industry (RAMI) organization and scored the 12 minute-long short film that helped the Rockford Park District win the 2012 National Gold Medal Award for Excellence in Park and Recreation from the National Recreation and Park Association (NRPA).

He owns and co-operates The Midwest Sound, a farm-house recording studio on the outskirts of Rockford, Illinois, and a two-time RAMI Award winner (2013 and 2014) for Best Recording Studio.

Selected discography

Albums
 The Piasa Bird (2016) - with J. Hardin (engineering/musician)
 Tired Dogs, Old Trees (2014) - with Derek Luttrell (engineering and production/musician)
 Here's How it Works (2014) - with The Mike Benign Compulsion
 Midnight Reruns (2013) - with Midnight Reruns (engineering)
 Final Night (2013) - with Daniel and The Lion (engineering and production/musician) 
 Death Head (2013) - with Daniel and The Lion (engineering and production credits/musician)
 Can't Wait (2013) - with Sugarstems
 Too Much to Lose (2013) - with Ron Rawhoof
 Haymaker (2012) - with Hayward Williams
 One May Morning (2012) - with Sarah Pray
 Great Divide (2012) - with The Great Divide
 Presents The Rusted Hearts (2011) - with Miles Nielsen and The Rusted Hearts
 Run, Engine, Run (2011) - with Trapper Schoepp & The Shades
 Sweet Teeth (2011) - with Daniel and The Lion (full engineering and production credits)
 Is a Beast (2011) - with Cameron McGill & What Army
 House of Doors (2010) - with Amy Petty
 Cotton Bell (2010) - with Hayward Williams
 Miles (2009) - with Miles Nielsen
 Warm Songs for Cold Shoulders (2009) - with Cameron McGill & What Army
 Highway Specific (2009) - with Matthew Davies
 A Long List of Lies (2008) - with Josh Harty
 Cabin Ghosts (2008) - with Cory Chisel and The Wandering Sons
 Another Sailor's Dream (2007) - with Hayward Williams
 Long Gone (2006) - with Blueheels
 Little Bird (2006) - with Cory Chisel and The Wandering Sons
 Minimalist & Anchored (2006) - with Heller Mason
 Carry it Around (2006) - with The New Kentucky Quarter
 Again from the Beginning (2004) - with The Wandering Sons
 Alice Street and More (2003) - with Breathing Machine

EPs
 Even Hitler Had a Girlfriend 7" (2014) - with Dr. Frank
 Already Gone/Skyway 7" (2012) - with Limbeck  
 St. Louis Sessions (2012) - with Miles Nielsen and The Rusted Hearts
 Deserters (2010) - with Cameron McGill & What Army
 Madeline, Every Girl (2010) - with Cameron McGill & What Army
 No Harm, No Foul (2009) - with Nathaniel Waldschmidt
 Two Hits and a Miss (2009) - with Cameron McGill & What Army
 Long Long Road (2008) - with Kelly Steward
 Ten Tiny Little Pieces (2007) - with Martha Berner
 Darken Your Door (2005) - with The Wandering Sons

References

External links
 Daniel McMahon's Official website 
 Miles Nielsen and The Rusted Hearts' Official website 
 The Midwest Sound Official website

1982 births
American multi-instrumentalists
Record producers from Illinois
American audio engineers
Living people